Kretzmer is a surname. Notable people with the surname include:

David Kretzmer (born 1943), Israeli expert in international and constitutional law
Herbert Kretzmer (1925–2020), English journalist and lyricist

See also
Kretzer